Gordon Llewellyn Allott (January 2, 1907January 17, 1989) was a Republican  American politician.

Allott was born in Pueblo, Colorado to Bertha (née Llewellyn) and Leonard J. Allott; his maternal grandparents were Welsh and his paternal grandparents were English. He graduated from the University of Colorado at Boulder in 1927 and from its law school in 1929. Allott was also an athlete in his youth, winning the 440 yd hurdles at the 1929 United States championships. He was admitted to the bar in 1929 and commenced practice in Pueblo. He moved to Lamar, Colorado in 1930 and continued practicing law.

Allott was the county attorney of Prowers County, Colorado in 1934 and from 1941 to 1946. He was also the director of the First Federal Savings & Loan Association of Lamar from 1934 to 1960. He became Lamar's city attorney in 1937, and served in this position until 1941.

During World War II, Allott served as a major in the United States Army Air Forces from 1942 to 1946. After the war he became a district attorney in the fifteenth judicial district from 1946 to 1948. He was the vice chairman of the Colorado Board of Paroles from 1951 to 1955, and he served as the 33rd Lieutenant Governor of Colorado from 1951 to 1955 under Democratic Governor Walter Walford Johnson and Republican Governor Daniel I. J. Thornton.

Allott was elected to the United States Senate in 1954. He was reelected in 1960 and again in 1966, and served from January 3, 1955 to January 3, 1973. There he was Chairman of the Republican Policy Committee. Allott voted in favor of the Civil Rights Acts of 1957, 1964, and 1968, as well as the 24th Amendment to the U.S. Constitution, the Voting Rights Act of 1965, and the confirmation of Thurgood Marshall to the U.S. Supreme Court, while Allott did not vote on the Civil Rights Act of 1960.

Allott died in Englewood, Colorado, and was interred in Fairmount Cemetery, Denver, Colorado.

Paul Weyrich and George Will worked on his Senate staff.

See also
List of Chairpersons of the College Republicans

Sources

 Scribner Encyclopedia of American Lives.

External links

|-

|-

|-

 

1907 births
1989 deaths
20th-century American lawyers
20th-century American politicians
American athlete-politicians
American male hurdlers
United States Army Air Forces personnel of World War II
American people of English descent
American people of Welsh descent
College Republican National Committee chairs
Colorado Republicans
District attorneys in Colorado
Lieutenant Governors of Colorado
People from Lamar, Colorado
People from Pueblo, Colorado
Republican Party United States senators from Colorado
United States Army Air Forces officers
20th-century American Episcopalians
Military personnel from Colorado
Burials at Fairmount Cemetery (Denver, Colorado)